Ōnomatsu is the name of:

the sixth yokozuna in the sport of sumo Ōnomatsu Midorinosuke
the sumo stable Ōnomatsu stable currently run by former sekiwake Masurao
the elder name normally associated with the above stable